Hårek of Tjøtta (965 in Tjøtta – 1036) was a Norwegian farmer and local chieftain. He was a son of the skald, Eyvindr skáldaspillir, who ruled from Tjøttagodset (a large manor). Hårek resided at Tjøtta in Nordland (north Norway), and had significant influence in the district of Hålogaland. He participated in the Battle of Stiklestad in 1030, where his peasant army defeated Olaf Haraldsson. Six years later when visiting king Magnus Olavsson I also known as Magnus the Good (the son of Olaf Haraldsson) in Trondheim, he was killed by axe in 1036 by rival chieftain Åsmund Grankjellsson, and thus the former king's son got his revenge.

Further reading 

 Birgitta Berglund (1995). Tjøtta-riket: en arkeologisk undersøkelse av maktforhold og sentrumsdannelser på Helgelandskysten fra Kr. f. til 1700 e. Kr. Trondheim: UNIT, Vitenskapsmuseet, Fakultet for arkeologi og kulturhistorie, Arkeologisk avdeling. .
 Ståle Botn (1997). Lendmann og jarl: en historisk roman om Hårek Øyvindsson på Tjøtta. [Oslo]: Landbruksforl. .

References

960s births
1036 deaths
10th-century Norwegian people
11th-century Norwegian people
Norwegian farmers
Norwegian manslaughter victims
Axe murder
History of Nordland